Babinci is a village in the Municipality of Ljutomer in northeastern Slovenia. The area traditionally belonged to the Styria region and is now included in the Mura Statistical Region.

Name
Babinci was attested in written sources  1280–1295 as villa Wakendorf. Like similar place names (e.g., Babna Brda, Babiči, Babna Gora, etc.), the name is derived from the Slovene common noun baba. In addition to the basic meaning 'old woman', baba often means 'rocky outcrop, cliff; mountain top, peak' and generally refers to a local terrain feature.

Cultural heritage
There is a small chapel in the centre of the village.  It was built in the late 19th century.

References

External links
Babinci on Geopedia

Populated places in the Municipality of Ljutomer